Burwell is a city in Garfield County, Nebraska, United States. The population was 1,210 at the 2010 census. It is the county seat of Garfield County.

History
Burwell was platted in 1883. In 1887, the Chicago, Burlington and Quincy Railroad was extended to Burwell.

Burwell is host to "Nebraska's Big Rodeo", an annual event usually held the last weekend of July. This has been an important event for the town's economy and has been a staple for over 80 years. Burwell was one of the initial FFA chapters of the state of Nebraska. The chapter was chartered March 1929.

Geography

Climate

Demographics

2010 census
As of the census of 2010, there were 1,210 people, 574 households, and 312 families living in the city. The racial makeup of the city was 99.4% White, 0.2% African American, 0.1% from other races, and 0.2% from two or more races. Hispanic or Latino of any race were 0.9% of the population.

There were 574 households, of which 21.3% had children under the age of 18 living with them, 48.1% were married couples living together, 4.9% had a female householder with no husband present, 1.4% had a male householder with no wife present, and 45.6% were non-families. 43.2% of all households were made up of individuals, and 26.2% had someone living alone who was 65 years of age or older. The average household size was 2.06 and the average family size was 2.87.

The median age in the city was 49.8 years. 21.3% of residents were under the age of 18; 5.3% were between the ages of 18 and 24; 16.8% were from 25 to 44; 27.3% were from 45 to 64; and 29.3% were 65 years of age or older. The gender makeup of the city was 46.8% male and 53.2% female.

2000 census
As of the census of 2000, there were 1,130 people, 507 households, and 277 families living in the city. The population density was 1,091.0 people per square mile (419.5/km2). There were 622 housing units at an average density of 600.5 per square mile (230.9/km2). The racial makeup of the city was 98.32% White, 0.27% Native American, 0.53% from other races, and 0.88% from two or more races. Hispanic or Latino of any race were 1.24% of the population.

There were 507 households, out of which 24.1% had children under the age of 18 living with them, 48.5% were married couples living together, 4.7% had a female householder with no husband present, and 45.2% were non-families. 42.8% of all households were made up of individuals, and 27.6% had someone living alone who was 65 years of age or older. The average household size was 2.12 and the average family size was 2.97.

In the city, the population was spread out, with 23.0% under the age of 18, 4.2% from 18 to 24, 20.1% from 25 to 44, 23.7% from 45 to 64, and 28.9% who were 65 years of age or older. The median age was 47 years. For every 100 females, there were 82.8 males. For every 100 females age 18 and over, there were 75.1 males.

As of 2000 the median income for a household in the city was $22,569, and the median income for a family was $33,558. Males had a median income of $24,875 versus $17,222 for females. The per capita income for the city was $13,949. About 10.3% of families and 14.3% of the population were below the poverty line, including 13.5% of those under age 18 and 23.7% of those age 65 or over.

Notable people

 Kate Sullivan, Nebraska legislator

References

Cities in Nebraska
Cities in Garfield County, Nebraska
County seats in Nebraska